Yaphet Kotto was a hardcore punk band, named after the actor, from Santa Cruz, California active between 1996 and 2005. The band Yaphet Kotto formed after the demise of another band called Staple, of which Casey Watson and Mag Delana were members. Lyrically, the group dealt with social and political issues. They were also known for their chaotic and cathartic compositions which blended melody and extremity. The group released three full-length albums on Ebullition Records, and made several singles, extended plays, and appearances on split-albums and compilations.

History 
Yaphet Kotto was formed in Santa Cruz, California in 1996 by former members of a band called Staple, guitarist/vocalist Casey Watson and guitarist/vocalist Mag Delana. Bassist Pat Crowley, a childhood friend of Watson, joined shortly before drummer Scott Batiste. The band got their name from American actor Yaphet Kotto, with whom Delana was "fascinated with." An insert in their first release The Killer Was in the Government Blankets stated "Yaphet Kotto is part of no scene. Enjoy music for what it is/Not who it is." The band's lyrics dealt with various social and political issues such as the genocide of the Native Americans ("The Killer Was In The Government Blankets"), revolutionary inaction ("B and C"), the War on Terror ("Circumstantial Evidence"), American democracy ("Fact Nor Fiction"), and the legacy of segregation in America ("Reserved for Speaker"). Since the dissolution of Yaphet Kotto, former members have joined bands such as Saviours, Look Back and Laugh, Baader Brains, The Third Victim of Abigail Rutledge, Never Healed, The Old Firm Casuals and Middle-Aged Queers.

Discography 
The Killer Was in the Government Blankets EP (1998, Analog Kid Records)
The Killer Was in the Government Blankets LP (1999, Ebullition)
"Critical Response"/"Collapse & Die" 7" (2000, Council) - split single with Suicide Nation
Syncopated Synthetic Laments for Love (2001, Ebullition)
Yaphet Kotto/This Machine Kills/Envy (2002, Sonzai) - split album with This Machine Kills and Envy
Yaphet Kotto EP (2002, Council)
"European Tour" 12" (2003, Scene Police)
We Bury Our Dead Alive (2004, Ebullition)
Unreleased (2008, self-released)

Members

Last known lineup 

 Mag Delana
 Casey Watson
 Austin Barber
 Scott Batiste

Other known members 
 Steve Roche
 Chris Story
 Paul Cameron
 Pat Crowley
 Keith Miller
 Jose Palafox
 Luke Clements

References

External Links
 

Musical groups established in 1996
Musical groups disestablished in 2005
Hardcore punk groups from California
Emo musical groups
American screamo musical groups